Gadaba language refers to a language of the Gadaba people. This may be:

Gutob language (Bodo or Boi Gadaba), an Austro-Asiatic language
Ollari language (Ollar or Pottangi Gadaba), a Dravidian language
Kondekor language (Mudhili or Gol Gadaba), closely related to Ollari

br:Gadabeg